Hits is the first compilation album by American country music artist Gary Morris. It was released on October 1987 via Warner Bros. Records.

Track listing

Chart performance

References

1987 compilation albums
Gary Morris albums
Albums produced by Jimmy Bowen
Albums produced by Bob Montgomery (songwriter)
Albums produced by Jim Ed Norman
Albums produced by Paul Worley
Warner Records compilation albums